David Xanatos is a fictional character and one of the primary villains of the Disney animated television series Gargoyles. In the series, he is the founder, owner and CEO of Xanatos Enterprises and a member of the Illuminati.  He was voiced by and inspired by Jonathan Frakes, specifically his character of William Riker in Star Trek: The Next Generation.

Xanatos' behavior is often ruthless and amoral, although his personality is slightly softened later in the series by his affection for his wife Fox and their infant son Alexander. His plans are often intricate and Machiavellian—however, he is notably not vindictive as he sees revenge as foolish and even tends to try to see the positive side of his defeats. In fact, Xanatos is notorious for his intricate plans that often have multiple interplaying goals to endeavor that some beneficial result is achieved in one way or another—so much so that the style of plotting has been christened the Xanatos Gambit. Despite the frequent intervention of Goliath and his clan of gargoyles, Xanatos is generally able to convert any outcome into some degree of victory, or at least a pyrrhic defeat. He is obsessed with obtaining immortality for himself and his family. His loyal right-hand man is Owen Burnett, a stoic man with extraordinary hidden talents whom Xanatos gained the service of through equally remarkable circumstances.

Xanatos is a formidable fighter in his own right. In addition to advanced karate and judo skills, he also has a specialized red armored suit modeled on his Steel Clan robots that he wears frequently, with both Xanatos' armored suit and Steel Clan robots appearing to be partly modeled on Goliath's general appearance and size. He also has a highly advanced anthropomorphic AI device modeled after himself, designed to do his bidding. This robot became the leader of the criminal group The Pack under the name of Coyote, and on one occasion, he actually used it to try to capture the actual Coyote spirit.

Fictional biography
David Xanatos started life as the son of Petros Xanatos, a Greek immigrant who worked as a fisherman in Bar Harbor, Maine.  Young Xanatos received an anonymous letter containing a set of valuable 10th-century coins. He sold the coins for $20,000 and invested the money in a series of successful ventures, thus pulling himself out of poverty in the process. He would later embark on a business career, the first steps toward building his own company, Xanatos Enterprises. Despite his father's belief that Xanatos did not deserve the gift that had launched his career, Xanatos continued to claim that he would one day prove himself a self-made man.

During this time, Xanatos took on Owen Burnett under his wing, a former employee of business rival Halcyon Renard, as his assistant. Eventually, Burnett revealed that he is actually Puck, a Child of Oberon, and offered Xanatos a tempting choice: a single wish to gain immortality or a lifetime of service as the mortal Owen Burnett.  Against Puck's expectations, Xanatos, confident that he could achieve immortality through other methods, chose Owen's service, and the decision deeply impressed Puck to keep his end of the bargain, with the inference that, should Xanatos achieve his goal, he will be guaranteed Puck/Owen's services for eternity.

Xanatos learned of Castle Wyvern from Demona, the only gargoyle from the Wyvern Clan who had neither been destroyed nor put into stone sleep. He purchased the ruins, transported them to Manhattan, and had it rebuilt atop his New York skyscraper, the Eyrie Building. With the castle "above the clouds," Xanatos successfully released the Manhattan Clan from their frozen sleep.

Xanatos initially posed as the Gargoyles' friend, convincing them to "acquire" technology from his rival Cyberbiotics for him and ultimately attempting to destroy the gargoyles with replacements he has built, the Steel Clan, when the gargoyles proved too hard to control. The Steel Clan was defeated, however, and Xanatos was convicted for receiving stolen property. Xanatos continued to plot against the Gargoyles from prison, testing them and attempting to remove them from the castle. Upon his release, he became one of their greatest enemies, having a particularly fierce rivalry with their leader, Goliath.

Xanatos also committed himself to make his own clan of gargoyles that would be loyal and obedient to him. To that end, he tried several attempts throughout the series to do that such as resurrecting Goliath's brother Coldstone and other dead gargoyles from the Wyvern Clan; enlisting the services of a "freelance geneticist" named Dr. Anton Sevarius to craft unwitting human subjects towards genetically creating gargoyle-like mutates from humans, one of whom was Elisa Maza's younger brother, Derek; creating a clone of Goliath named Thailog, and perfecting the Steel Clan. During this time, he also discovered the existence of the Illuminati and attained membership.

Xanatos gave up on creating his own gargoyles and instead changed his goal to acquiring immortality through the use of sorcery and magic, even involving himself with children of Oberon, including Oberon himself—the formidable Lord of the mystical island of Avalon.

Xanatos would meet an equal in Fox and marry her. It was on this occasion that, by inviting Goliath to the wedding and luring him into seeking reconciliation with Demona, Xanatos was able to reconstruct the Phoenix Gate. The wedding party was brought back in time to the 10th century, where Xanatos arranged for the ancient coins to be delivered to himself a thousand years in the future, via Illuminati, as well as a message describing what to do with them. In this way, Xanatos fulfilled his own history through a predestination paradox, at the same time proving himself to his father as a "self-made man".

When Demona finally betrayed Xanatos to advance her own goals of destroying the human race, he was forced to call a truce with Goliath to stop her. Goliath was later instrumental in saving Xanatos's newborn son Alexander, something which Xanatos owed him a great debt, and pledged to pay back to him. He soon created new robotic bodies for Coldstone's other personalities to inhabit, which he named Coldfire and Coldsteel. Since these gargoyles were also created by magic, though, it was impossible for mind transfer to occur. While he and Fox were out to dinner, Puck and Alexander performed the transfer for him. When the existence of the gargoyles was revealed to the public, Xanatos puts an end to the feud between them and voluntarily allows the gargoyles to come back to live in their ancestral castle.

Relationships
Though at first Xanatos seems to have an on and off partnership with Demona when neither magic nor technology seems to be enough to accomplish what they plan to do, neither Xanatos nor Demona seem to truly trust one another. This proves to be a fatal flaw on their part, that tends to doom their future plans towards failure.

In general, Xanatos has an odd way of dealing with those he "loves". One example can be found in Thailog, Goliath's clone that he had Sevarius create. While the clone was being grown he had a program playing giving him information about the world and his beliefs. He seemed to have a paternal feeling towards Thailog as, when the gargoyle was kidnapped during his stone slumber, he would not let Owen fire on the kidnappers out of fear of hurting Thailog, and handed over $20,000,000 for his safe return without a second thought. He even showed pride in Thailog's manipulative abilities and genius when he found out the clone had engineered the entire plot to abscond with the money, referring to him as "a chip off the ole block". He even expressed to Thailog that if he wanted the money he would have given it to him if he would have asked for it. However, his paternalism seems thin as, when he thinks Thailog died during the battle with Goliath, he states that he knew the whole time that a copy couldn't match the original, which infuriates Goliath as Xanatos was able to dehumanize a living being to such terms. Though arguably lacking romance, Xanatos asks Fox to marry him on the basis that "it makes sense" because they are genetically compatible, share the same interests, and "love each other" as much as two people such as themselves can.

Though he does love Fox, he is shown using her to get what he wants as well. In the episode "Eye of the Beholder", Xanatos gives Fox the Avalon-crafted Eye of Odin as an engagement gift. The necklace holds unfathomable occult powers that Fox cannot control, turning her into a large red-haired beast resembling a werewolf. Though Xanatos suspects it has an effect on her, he does not fully understand until he witnesses Fox transform in front of him. Terrified by what he has set into motion, he asks Goliath and Elisa for assistance, though they are initially reluctant. Goliath seems especially perturbed at how he has treated Fox and seemingly disregarded her life.

As Fox continues to go on rampages in search of food, Xanatos, Goliath, and Elisa scour the city for her. Eventually, they chase her to a rooftop and Goliath is able to free Fox from the Eye of Odin after electrocuting her with a neon sign. While preparing to leave and while holding Fox in his arms, Xanatos regretfully informs Goliath that now he knows his only weakness. Goliath turns to him, slightly disgusted and remarks, "Only you would regard love as a weakness." These words leave Xanatos speechless, but silently admits.

In the episodes of the Gathering, Xanatos seems instinctively protective of both Fox and Alexander, seemingly having come to terms with the idea of love not being a weakness. Indeed, it motivates him to such a degree that through his cunning and invention he actually provides Oberon with something of a challenge.

Appearance in media

SLG Comic
Soon after, Owen received a call from Mr. Duval from The Illuminati for Xanatos. Xanatos refused as he spent some time with his son that night. On Halloween Night, he's later visited by Martin Hacker, who gives him an invitation to the White House. From there he meets another Illuminati member, Quincy Hemings, who gives him a mission to retrieve the Stone of Destiny. To ensure success, he sends some Steel and Iron Clan robots to assist them.

The Goliath Chronicles
The third season of Gargoyles was called The Goliath Chronicles. In this season, Xanatos was portrayed as a benefactor to the Gargoyles. Greg Weisman, the main writer behind Gargoyles, disagreed with how Xanatos is portrayed in the Goliath Chronicles. Weisman has stated that he believes that if the feud with the clan ended, Xanatos would still seek to achieve his own goals. This is acknowledged by Brooklyn and Goliath in #1 of the Slave Labor Graphics comic continuation that while he isn't 100% trustworthy, they trust him not to smash them during the day. In the Goliath Chronicles, Xanatos must deal with pressure from The Illuminati in terms of turning the clan over to them.

References

Further reading

Animated human characters
Fictional businesspeople
Fictional characters from Maine
Television characters introduced in 1994
Fictional judoka
Fictional karateka
Fictional members of secret societies
Fictional socialites
Fictional tricksters
Gargoyles (TV series) characters
Villains in animated television series
Male characters in animated series
Fictional Greek people
Disney animated villains
Male villains
Animated characters introduced in 1994